Svein Terje Gulbrandsen (29 November 1944 – 25 September 2015) was a Norwegian footballer who played as a midfielder. At club level he won the Norwegian League once and the Cup twice with Skeid. He represented the Norway national football team on two occasions in 1969.

Gulbrandsen's daughter Solveig Gulbrandsen also became a professional footballer and won an Olympic gold medal with the Norway women's national football team.

References

External links
 

1944 births
2015 deaths
Norwegian footballers
Norway international footballers
Skeid Fotball players
Vålerenga Fotball players

Association football midfielders